Annie Raines (born July 3, 1969, in Boston, Massachusetts) is an American musician, best known as a harmonicist. She grew up in Newton, Massachusetts. She is Jewish.

Raines took up the harmonica at the age of 17. As a freshman, she left Antioch College to pursue a musical career. Fascinated by the sounds of Muddy Waters, Little Walter Jacobs, and Sonny Boy Williamson, she spent time absorbing the music of the Chicago blues masters. She began to busk locally and played gigs at local Boston clubs, and later traveled to Chicago where she met and played with Pinetop Perkins, and James Cotton. While working regularly on the regional blues circuit, Raines taught harmonica and began developing her own style within the blues tradition.

She met and began working with Paul Rishell, who lent musical support to her harmonica, piano, singing and songwriting skills. This gave her the opportunity to study country blues innovators such as Noah Lewis and Sonny Terry, and, more recently, to take up the mandolin.

References

External links
 Paul Rishell and Annie Raines' website
 Annie Raines bio and sound sample on Hohner website

1969 births
Living people
American street performers
American blues harmonica players
Harmonica blues musicians
Musicians from Boston